Manuel Isidoro Perez Sánchez (born 1776 in Pozo de Guadalajara) was a Spanish clergyman and bishop for the Roman Catholic Archdiocese of Antequera, Oaxaca. He was ordained in 1820. He was appointed bishop in 1820. He died in 1840.

References 

1776 births
1840 deaths
Spanish Roman Catholic bishops
People from the Province of Guadalajara